Harold William "Joe" Bauer (November 20, 1908 – November 14, 1942) was a United States Marine Corps air group commander, fighter pilot and flying ace credited with destroying 11 Japanese aircraft during World War II. He was posthumously awarded the Medal of Honor for his actions as a fighter squadron commander during the crucial struggle for the control of the Solomon Islands at the Battle of Guadalcanal.

Early years
Harold William Bauer was born in Woodruff, Kansas on 20 November 1908 and grew up in North Platte, Nebraska. He was the son of Volga German immigrants and had two brothers and two sisters. In high school, he played football, track and baseball.

Military career

Early career
Bauer entered the United States Naval Academy in 1926 and was appointed a Marine second lieutenant upon graduation in 1930. Bauer's two younger brothers also followed him into the Academy. Following his commissioning, Bauer attended the Officers Basic School at Quantico, Virginia. He was then assigned as a company officer with the 1st Battalion, 6th Marines at Quantico.

In 1932, he became assistant basketball and lacrosse coach at the Naval Academy and an instructor in marksmanship, until his assignment to the San Diego Naval Base, where he was the Assistant Range Officer. He was promoted to first lieutenant on 29 May 1934.

He was then assigned to the Naval Air Station Pensacola, Florida, in December 1934 where he earned his wings of gold as a naval aviator in February 1936. He was promoted to captain on June 30, 1937 and served with several squadrons at Quantico including Marine Scouting Squadron 1 (VMS-1) and Marine Fighting Squadron 1 (VMF-1). Bauer was transferred to the Naval Air Station San Diego, California, in June 1940 where he served as executive officer of VMF-221. The 7 December 1941 attack on Pearl Harbor found Bauer and VMF-221 preparing to embark aboard the Saratoga for transport to Hawaii.

World War II

Following the Japanese attack on Pearl Harbor, Bauer and VMF-221 were transported to Hawaii and were slated to reinforce Wake Island, but were diverted to Midway after Wake fell. Transferred to Hawaii in February 1942, Bauer took command of VMF-211, stationed at Marine Corps Air Station Ewa, and on 1 March 1942 commissioned and took command of VMF-212. Promoted to major on 29 April 1942, Bauer and VMF-212 were deployed to the South Pacific and were stationed at New Caledonia, and later Efate, Vanuatu. Although still the commanding officer of VMF-212, Bauer was also responsible for the operation of the airfield the squadron operated from and was utilized to select possible sites for additional airfields in the South Pacific. Bauer's promotion to lieutenant colonel, after only three months as a major, was effective 7 August.

On 28 September 1942, Bauer performed the first feat cited for the Medal of Honor. His squadron was attacked by a superior force of Japanese planes. He engaged the enemy and shot down one of their bombers. Again attacking a superior force on 3 October 1942, he shot down four of the enemy and left a fifth badly damaged.

Though the long flight from Espirito Santo had almost exhausted his fuel and he knew no friendly planes were able to assist him, he immediately proceeded alone to attack the enemy and succeeded in destroying four of them before lack of gasoline forced him to return to Henderson Field.

He was seen in the water in his Mae West water flotation device as light was fading. He did not appear to be seriously hurt. The following morning began days of intense searching by planes and Russell Island natives, but no further trace of him was found.

The squadron under his command at Guadalcanal was officially credited with downing 92 Japanese planes and helping to sink two destroyers. Lieutenant Colonel Bauer was commended for his action in the South Pacific by commanders of Army, Navy and Marine Corps units including Admiral William F. Halsey, Jr., then Commander of the South Pacific Area and South Pacific Force.

Bauerfield International Airport in Port Vila, Vanuatu is named in his honor.

Medals and decorations
Bauer's medals and decorations include:

Medal of Honor citation
The President of the United States takes pride in presenting the MEDAL OF HONOR to

for service as set forth in the following CITATION:

For extraordinary heroism and conspicuous courage as Squadron Commander of Marine Fighting Squadron TWO TWELVE in the South Pacific Area during the period May 10 to November 14, 1942. Volunteering to pilot a fighter plane in defense of our positions on Guadalcanal, Solomon Islands, Lieutenant Colonel Bauer participated in two air battles against enemy bombers and fighters outnumbering our force more than two-to-one, boldly engaged the enemy and destroyed one Japanese bomber in the engagement of September 28 and shot down four enemy fighter planes in flames on October 3 leaving a fifth smoking badly. Undaunted by the formidable opposition and with valor above and beyond the call of duty, he engaged the entire squadron and, although alone and his fuel supply nearly exhausted, fought his plane so brilliantly that four of the Japanese planes were destroyed before he was forced down by lack of fuel. His intrepid fighting spirit and distinctive ability as leader and an airman, exemplified in his splendid record of combat achievement, were vital in the successful operations in the South Pacific Area.
/S/FRANKLIN D. ROOSEVELT

See also
List of Medal of Honor recipients for World War II

Notes

References

External links

1908 births
1942 deaths
United States Marine Corps personnel killed in World War II
American World War II flying aces
American people of German-Russian descent
Aviators from Kansas
People from Phillips County, Kansas
People from North Platte, Nebraska
United States Marine Corps Medal of Honor recipients
United States Marine Corps colonels
United States Marine Corps pilots of World War II
United States Naval Academy alumni
World War II recipients of the Medal of Honor
Quantico Marines Devil Dogs football players
Quantico Marines Devil Dogs football coaches
Aviators killed by being shot down
Aviators killed in aviation accidents or incidents